Moerarchis is a genus of moths belonging to the family Tineidae.

Species
Moerarchis anomogramma Meyrick, 1930 (=Exaxa rectilinea Diakonoff, 1968)
Moerarchis australasiella (Donovan, 1805) (=Tinea cossuna Lewin, 1805)
Moerarchis clathrata (Felder & Rogenh., 1875) (=Scardia dictyotis Meyrick, 1893)
Moerarchis galactodelta (Diakonoff, 1968) (from the Philippines)
Moerarchis hypomacra (Turner, 1923)
Moerarchis inconcisella (Walker, 1863)
Moerarchis lanosa (Diakonoff, 1949)
Moerarchis lapidea Turner, 1927
Moerarchis placomorpha Meyrick, 1922 (from Australia)
Moerarchis pyrochroa (Meyrick, 1893) (=Scardia xanthobapta Lower, 1903)

References

Myrmecozelinae